Apple soup is a soup prepared using apples as a primary ingredient. The apples can be puréed, sliced, or boiled and used whole. Onions, carrots, parsnip and pumpkin are used in some preparations. Some recipes use chicken or vegetable broth or stock, while some others use water or apple cider. Additional ingredients can be added according to taste, such as cinnamon, lemon juice, sugar, ginger, curry powder, salt and pepper. It is sometimes served as an appetizer.

Apple soup has been used as a dish to feed the sick, as occurred circa the early 1900s in the United States.

Gallery

See also

 List of soups

References

Fruit soups
Soup